Team Wang is a record label founded by rapper, singer songwriter, and record producer Jackson Wang. The label was established in 2017 and conducts business in music, production, and artist management. In 2020, Team Wang Design was launched, where Jackson Wang serves as the creative director and designer.

Label history 
Team Wang is an international record label, originating from China. Jackson Wang founded Team Wang in 2017, and subsequently, the label's first release was Wang's hit single, "Papillon". Released on 26 August 2017, the all-English track was Wang's first solo single.

On 25 October 2019, Team Wang released Wang's first full-length English album, Mirrors. The album reached #1 on Billboards independent music chart. Mirrors reached #32 on the Billboard 200, the highest-charting debut album from a Chinese artist. The album featured American rapper GoldLink and Indonesian rapper Rich Brian.

Other Team Wang releases include Wang's singles "100 Ways" and "Pretty Please", a collaboration with Swedish dance music duo Galantis. In December 2020, the label released Wang's Chinese single, "Should've Let Go", with JJ Lin.

Team Wang Design 
In July 2020, Jackson Wang launched a fashion collection with an eight piece monochromatic line called "Cookies – The Original". Other collaborations, which are also referred to as "Sparkles", include an exclusive release with StockX and a Claude Monet-inspired capsule in conjunction with Bund One Art Museum of Shanghai. Dubbed as "Team Wang x Monet Sparkles", it paid homage to Paris and celebrated the first time Claude Monet's Impression, Sunrise painting was shown in Shanghai. At the end of 2020, Team Wang announced the release of The Cart.

On 17 January 2021, Jackson Wang announced the launch of Team Wang's second collection "Cookies – The Velvet".

Collaborations 
Team Wang has partnered with many brands, including:
 Fendi
 Ray-Ban
 Super X
 Monet
 Cartier
 Beats By Dr.Dre
 L'Oreal Men
 Braun
 Vivo
 Dr.Jart+
 Pepsi
 Armani Beauty

Key people 
 Jackson Wang (CEO, founder & designer, creative director)
 Henry Cheung (Chairman, co-founder of Team Wang Design)

Artists

Recording artists

Groups
 Panthepack

Soloists
 Ice
 Jackson Wang
 J.Sheon
 Karencici
 Xenzu
 Laurie

References

External links 

Record labels established in 2017